Pac or PAC may refer to:

Military
 Rapid Deployment Force (Malaysia), an armed forces unit
 Patriot Advanced Capability, of the MIM-104 Patriot missile
 Civil Defense Patrols (Patrullas de Autodefensa Civil), Guatemalan militia and paramilitary group

Geography
 Pac, Albania, a village in Bytyç

Organizations

Aviation
 IATA code PAC Albrook "Marcos A. Gelabert" International Airport in Panama City, Panama
 Pacific Aerospace Corporation, New Zealand, manufacturer of aircraft:
 PAC 750XL
 PAC Cresco
 PAC CT/4
 PAC Fletcher
 Pakistan Aeronautical Complex, aerospace manufacturer
 Polar Air Cargo airline, Purchase, New York, US

Business
 Panasonic Avionics Corporation, produces equipment and services for in-flight entertainment etc. 
 Peruvian Amazon Company, a former rubber company
 Planned Amortization Class, a type of collateralized mortgage obligation
 Price Activity Chart, in stock technical analysis
 Programa de Aceleração do Crescimento, an investment plan in Brazil

Education
 Panasonic Academic Challenge, a US national competition
 Postgraduate Applications Centre,  Ireland
 Prince Alfred College,  Australia
 Professionals' Academy of Commerce, an accounting school in Pakistan
 Peres Academic Center, a private college in Israel

Politics
 Anti-Corruption Party (Partido Anti-Corrupción), Honduras
 Armed Proletarians for Communism (Proletari Armati per il Comunismo), a former Italian group
 Pan Africanist Congress, South Africa
 Partido Acción Ciudadana (disambiguation), several political parties in Latin America
 Peoples' Aman Committee, a criminal gang and welfare group associated with the Pakistan Peoples Party
 Political action committee, U.S. political fundraiser
 Political Affairs Committee (British Guiana)
 Polish American Congress
 Public Accounts Committee (India)
 Public Accounts Committee (Malaysia)
 Public Accounts Committee (United Kingdom)
 Public Affairs Committee (Malawi)

Other organizations
 Padiglione d'Arte Contemporanea, a museum in Milan, Italy
 Pedorthic Association of Canada
 Provincial Armed Constabulary
 Public Assistance Committee, former UK institution for assisting the poor

People
 Pac (wrestler) (born 1986), English professional wrestler
 Pac (family), of the Grand Duchy of Lithuania
 Tupac Shakur or Pac, 2Pac (1971–1996), American rapper

Science and technology

Biology and medicine
 Physician assistant, certified, commonly abbreviated in the USA as PA-C
 Plasma aldosterone concentration
 Post-abortion care
 Pre-anesthesia checkup
 Premature atrial contraction, a cardiac dysrhythmia
 Photoactivated adenylyl cyclase, a light-sensitive protein
 Proanthocyanidin, a type of flavanol
 Pulmonary artery catheterization

Computing and industrial
 Pacifica Coin, see List of TCP and UDP port numbers#Registered_ports
 Pin Array Cartridge, an integrated circuit packaging type
 Probably approximately correct, in machine learning
 Presentation–abstraction–control, in software architecture
 Programmable Automation Controller; see Computer appliance
 Proxy auto-config, a web browser technology

Other science and technology
 Perturbed angular correlation
 Polyaluminium chloride, less effective than aluminium chlorohydrate for water treatment
 Porting Authorisation Code, to transfer mobile phone numbers
 Pseudo algebraically closed field (PAC field), in mathematics
 Powdered activated carbon, used in electrochemical regeneration
 Pure and Applied Chemistry, the official monthly journal of IUPAC

Sports
 Pocket Athletic Conference, a USA (Indiana) high school athletic conference
 Pennsylvania Athletic Conference, former name of the Colonial States Athletic Conference, an NCAA Division III collegiate athletic conference located in Pennsylvania, United States
 Presidents' Athletic Conference, an NCAA Division III collegiate athletic conference located in the Appalachian region of the United States

Other uses
 Pan Asian Coalition, faction in the computer game Battlefield 2142
 Parent-Adult-Child, a model in transactional analysis
 Perfect authentic cadence, in music
 Performing arts center
 Providence Anime Conference, 2008

See also
 Pac-12 Conference (Pac-12), a US college athletic conference
 Pac-Man (disambiguation)
 Public Affairs Council (disambiguation)